Parotocinclus doceanus is a species of catfish in the family Loricariidae. It is native to South America, where it occurs in the Doce River basin. The species reaches 4.4 cm (1.7 inches) SL.

References 

Otothyrinae
Fish of the Doce River basin
Fish described in 1918